James Elphinstone may refer to:

James Elphinstone, 1st Lord Balmerino (1553?–1612), Scottish nobleman and politician, disgraced in 1609
James Elphinstone, 18th Lord Elphinstone, British nobleman, farmer, and financier
James Elphinstone Roe (1818–1897), convict transported to Western Australia
James Dalrymple-Horn-Elphinstone (1805–1886), British Conservative Party politician
Sir James Elphinstone, 1st Baronet (c. 1645–1722), of the Elphinstone baronets
Sir James Elphinstone, 3rd Baronet (c. 1710–1739), of the Elphinstone baronets

See also
James Elphinston (1721–1809), Scottish educator, orthographer, phonologist, and linguistics expert